The Wuhan–Shiyan high-speed railway is a high-speed passenger-dedicated line (PDL) in Hubei, China. It opened on 29 November 2019, connecting the city of Wuhan with the major automotive manufacturing centre of Shiyan in the northwest of the province.

The line starts from Hankou Station, a railhub with connections on:
Hefei–Wuhan passenger railway,
Shijiazhuang–Wuhan high-speed railway,
Wuhan–Yichang railway,
Beijing–Guangzhou railway,
Xiexindian–Gepu railway,
Macheng–Wuhan railway, and
Hankou–Danjiangkou railway.

The line runs northwest from Wuhan via Xiaogan to Xiangyang (where it intersects another new high-speed line running from Zhengzhou southwest to Wanzhou) to Shiyan. The line from Hankou to Xiaogan incorporates an existing inter-city railway, the Wuhan–Xiaogan intercity railway, which continues to provide intercity services using mainly C-class trains.

The railway is part of the Wuhan to Xi’an railway, the connecting  PDL from Shiyan to Xi’an is expected to be completed in 2023.

The existing Wuhan–Xiaogan intercity railway has stations at:
Hankou
Houhu
Jinyintan
Panlongcheng (planned but not yet constructed)
Tianhe Airport
Tianhejie
Minji
Maochen
Huaiyin
Xiaogan Dong (East)

The new section of the railway runs from Xiaogan Dong (East) to Shiyan Dong (East) and has intermediate stations at:
Yunmeng Dong (East),
Anluxi,
Suizhou Nan (South),
Suixian,
Zaoyang,
Xiangyang Dong (East),
Guchen Bei (North),
Danjiangkou,
Wudangshan Xi (West),
These stations are served by mainly G-class trains, some of which also call at Tianhe Airport.

In December 2019 there were 11 trains per day in each direction along the line, the fastest time between the terminals is now 1 hour 57 minutes (for example trains G6817 and G6818) the slowest direct train on the line takes 2 hour and 57 minutes and stops at most stations (train G6816).

See also
Shanghai–Wuhan–Chengdu passenger railway
Hankou–Danjiangkou railway

References

High-speed railway lines in China
Rail transport in Hubei
Railway lines opened in 2019
Transport in Wuhan
25 kV AC railway electrification